Joypur Assembly constituency is an assembly constituency in Purulia district in the Indian state of West Bengal.

Overview
As per orders of the Delimitation Commission, No. 241 Joypur Assembly constituency is composed of the following: Joypur and Jhalda II community development blocks; Arsha, Beldih and Manikary gram panchayata of Arsha community development block.

Joypur Assembly constituency is part of No. 35 Purulia (Lok Sabha constituency).

Members of Legislative Assembly

Election results

2021

 

Dibajyoti Singh Deo, contesting as an Independent candidate, was supported by the Trinamool Congress. Initially, he was a rebel Trinamool Congress candidate, but later the party supported him as the nomination of the candidate nominated by the party was rejected.

2016

2011

Shakti Pada Mahato, contesting as an independent candidate, was a rebel Congress candidate.

.# The changes for Shakti Pada Mahato (Independent/ rebel Congress) and Trinamool Congress are shown against the vote percentages of Congress and Trinamool Congress in 2006.

1977-2006
In the 2006 state assembly elections, Bindeswar Mahato of Forward Bloc won the Jaipur assembly seat, defeating his nearest rival Shantiram Mahato of Congress. Contests in most years were multi cornered but only winners and runners are being mentioned. Shantiram Mahato of Congress defeated Bindeswar Mahato of Forward Bloc in 2001 and 1996. Bindeswar Mahato of Forward Block defeated Shanti Ram Mahato of Congress in 1991 and 1987. Shantiram Mahato of Congress defeated Hari Pada Mahato of Forward Bloc in 1982. Ram Krishna Mahato of Congress defeated Chakradhar Mahato of Janata Party in 1977.

1962-1972
Ramkrishna Mahato of Congress won in 1972, 1971 and 1967. Adwaita Mondal of Lok Sewak Sangh won in 1962.

References

Assembly constituencies of West Bengal
Politics of Purulia district